Ardrossan Castle is situated on the west coast of Scotland in the town of Ardrossan, Ayrshire. The castle, defended by a moat, stands on a ridge above the town. There is a keep dating from the fifteenth century, and a vaulted range containing a kitchen and cellars.  In a deep passageway there is a well. Part of the keep remains up to the corbels of the parapet, but it is in ruins. The original castle, owned by Clan Barclay, was partly destroyed during the Wars of Scottish Independence. This event, in which the English garrison were slaughtered, became known as "Wallace's Larder," a name which is still applied to the remaining vaults. Rebuilt by Clan Montgomery in the 15th century, Ardrossan later fell into disuse and was partially demolished by the soldiers of Oliver Cromwell in the 17th century who used the stones to help construct the Ayr Citadel. This castle is the subject for a ghostlore story featuring the ghost of William Wallace.

History 
Ardrossan Castle is situated upon a rocky hill, which gives it its name, made up of ard, meaning height, and rossan, a rocky promontory. The present ruins are on the site of an earlier castle owned by the Barclay family.  By the thirteenth century it had passed to the Ardrossan family.

The castle has long been deemed a distinctive feature of the town of Ardrossan.  It was included, for example, in the tour book from 1847 titled Sylvan's Pictorial Handbook to the Clyde and its Watering-Places by Thomas and Edward Gilks.  There the castle is described as a marker of regional identity and subject antiquarian interest, from which beautiful views of the ocean can be seen. The Gilks state that Ardrossan was originally called "Castle Crags", but was renamed Ardrossan after the family who owned it. At the time of writing the castle was the property of the Eglintoun family, though it was already ruined, and was adjacent to an old churchyard.

Later history
The castle remained until 1648, when Oliver Cromwell's troops destroyed it, removing much of the stone and taking it to Ayr to build a fort, called the Ayr Citadel, there. The ruins of this castle still stand, but are in hazardous condition. The building has been designated a Scheduled monument.

Legends 
The castle is said to be haunted by the ghost of William Wallace, who is said to wander the ruins on stormy nights.

The castle is also associated with the Devil. Sir Fergus Barclay, also known as "the De'il of Ardrossan", was a horseman, famous around the lands for his tremendous skill. The secret to his skill, however, was a magical bridle, which was given to Barclay by the Devil, in exchange for his soul. However, the Devil was tricked by Barclay into giving his soul back. Infuriated by this trickery, the Devil attacked the castle in his rage, and is said to have left his hoof prints on one of the rocks. Sir Fergus Barclay is buried in the castle chapel, situated a few hundred yards inland from the castle, further down the hill.

Gallery

See also
 Montgomerieston - the Burgh of Regality at Ayr within the old Ayr Citadel partly built from Ardrossan Castle's stones.
 Scheduled monuments in North Ayrshire

Notes

Bibliography
 Coventry, Martin. The Castles of Scotland, Goblinshead, 2001
 Guthrie. History of Ardrossan, Guthrie Press
 Gilks, Thomas and Edward. 'Sylvan's Pictorial Handbook to the Clyde and its Watering-Places '' 1847

External links 

 Mysterious Britain Gazetteer: Ardrossan Castle
 Ardrossan Castle at CANMORE, Historic Environment Scotland
 Ardrossan Castle video and commentary

Castles in North Ayrshire
Category B listed buildings in North Ayrshire
Listed castles in Scotland
Reportedly haunted locations in Scotland
Scheduled Ancient Monuments in North Ayrshire
Ardrossan−Saltcoats−Stevenston